Ivan Pudar (born 16 August 1961) is a Croatian professional football manager and former player who was most recently the manager of Caspiy.

Playing career
During his club career he played for Hajduk Split, Spartak Subotica and Boavista. He earned one cap for the Yugoslavia national team against China in 1985 and was a reserve keeper in the squad that Miljan Miljanić took to the 1982 World Cup.

Managerial career
Following his retirement from playing professional football, he became manager, including a stint at Hajduk Split in 2007. In July 2008 he took charge of the Croatian Second Division side NK Trogir.

References

External links
 
 Ivan Pudar at Footballdatabase
 Profile at Serbian FA

1961 births
Living people
People from Zemun
Footballers from Belgrade
Croats of Serbia
Association football goalkeepers
Yugoslav footballers
Yugoslavia international footballers
1982 FIFA World Cup players
Olympic footballers of Yugoslavia
Footballers at the 1984 Summer Olympics
Medalists at the 1984 Summer Olympics
Olympic bronze medalists for Yugoslavia
Olympic medalists in football
HNK Hajduk Split players
FK Spartak Subotica players
S.C. Espinho players
Boavista F.C. players
Yugoslav First League players
Segunda Divisão players
Primeira Liga players
Yugoslav expatriate footballers
Expatriate footballers in Portugal
Croatian football managers
HNK Šibenik managers
HNK Hajduk Split managers
HNK Trogir managers
NK Solin managers
NK Hrvatski Dragovoljac managers
HNK Segesta managers
NK Zadar managers
RNK Split managers
FC Caspiy managers
Croatian expatriate football managers
Expatriate football managers in Kazakhstan
Croatian expatriate sportspeople in Kazakhstan

Croatian expatriate sportspeople in Portugal